Nicolae Bocșan (24 September 1947 – 19 June 2016) was a Romanian historian who specialized in the history of the Eastern Orthodox Church in the Banat and Transylvania and who also wrote extensively about the Revolution of 1848 in Transylvania. He was a member of the history faculty of the Babeș-Bolyai University and served as rector of the university 2004–2008.

Selection from bibliography

References 

1947 births
2016 deaths
Romanian historians of religion
Historians of Christianity
People from Bocșa
Babeș-Bolyai University alumni
Academic staff of Babeș-Bolyai University
Rectors of Babeș-Bolyai University